Chris Tsonis (born April 2, 1991) is an American professional soccer player.

Career

Youth and college
Tsonis began his career in the New England Revolution Academy, joining the club in 2008. In 2009, he joined Southern New Hampshire University and in his four seasons at the school he appeared in 83 matches and scored 40 goals. During his college career he also played with USL PDL sides New Hampshire Phantoms and Ventura County Fusion.

Professional
In February 2013 Tsonis signed with Icelandic club UMF Tindastóll. In his one season at the club Tsonis appeared in 21 matches and scored 7 goals as the club maintained its First Division status. His play with Tindastóll drew the attention of newly promoted top flight club Fjölnir Reykjavík. Tsonis signed with the club for the 2014 season and scored 5 goals in 21 appearances.

Tsonis signed with New York Red Bulls II for the 2015 season and made his debut as a starter for the side in its first ever match on March 28, 2015 in a 0–0 draw with Rochester Rhinos. On May 30, 2015 Tsonis scored his first goal for New York in a 4–2 loss to Richmond Kickers. On June 30, 2015 Tsonis scored the loan goal for New York Red Bulls II in a 1–0 victory over Wilmington Hammerheads. On July 25, 2015 Tsonis scored twice for New York, helping Red Bull II to a 4–2 victory over Richmond Kickers.

In 2016, Tsonis signed with United Soccer League club Charleston Battery.

References

External links

newyorkredbulls.com profile
tindastoll.com profile
wilmelsport.com profile

1991 births
Living people
American soccer players
American expatriate soccer players
Seacoast United Phantoms players
Ventura County Fusion players
Chris Tsonis
New York Red Bulls II players
Charleston Battery players
Association football forwards
Soccer players from Massachusetts
Expatriate footballers in Iceland
USL League Two players
USL Championship players
Southern New Hampshire Penmen men's soccer players
People from Dartmouth, Massachusetts